Louisvale is a town in ZF Mgcawu District Municipality in the Northern Cape province of South Africa. It has been described as a "small, impoverished town" by the Mail & Guardian, and it briefly became notorious for the baby Tshepang case, regarding the rape of a nine-month-old baby in 2001.

The Louisvale Pirates football team hails from this town.

References

Populated places in the Dawid Kruiper Local Municipality